The Mashonaland Under-24s cricket team was a first-class cricket team representing the Mashonaland province in Zimbabwe. They competed in the Logan Cup from 1994 to 1995. The club played their home matches at the Alexandra Sports Club.

First-class record

See also
Finlay Massey

References 

Former senior cricket clubs in Zimbabwe
Former Zimbabwean first-class cricket teams
History of Zimbabwean cricket
Cricket teams in Zimbabwe